"Walk a Little Straighter" is a song co-written and recorded by American country music artist Billy Currington.  It was released in April 2003 as his debut single and the first from his self-titled debut album. The song peaked at number 8 on the U.S. Billboard Hot Country Singles & Tracks chart. Currington wrote this song with Casey Beathard and Carson Chamberlain.

Content
Currington wrote the chorus to "Walk a Little Straighter" when he was twelve years old. The song is about witnessing his own father's alcoholism, and how he wishes not to pass that trait onto his own children.

Chart performance
"Walk a Little Straighter" debuted at number 56 on the U.S. Billboard Hot Country Singles & Tracks for the week of May 3, 2003.

Year-end charts

References

Songs about alcohol

2003 debut singles
Country ballads
2000s ballads
Billy Currington songs
Songs written by Carson Chamberlain
Songs written by Casey Beathard
Songs written by Billy Currington
Song recordings produced by Carson Chamberlain
Mercury Nashville singles
2003 songs
Music videos directed by Margaret Malandruccolo
Songs about fathers